Beat Fierz (born  in Basel, Switzerland) is a Swiss chemist and molecular biologist, currently an Associate Professor at the EPFL (École Polytechnique Fédérale de Lausanne). His research is focused on understanding dynamic processes of large molecular systems, particularly in chromatin regulation.

Career 
Beat Fierz studied molecular biology and biophysical chemistry at the Biozentrum of the University of Basel. After the diploma in 2002, he joined the laboratory of Thomas Kiefhaber at the Biozentrum for a PhD in protein folding and dynamics. There, he used nanosecond laser photolysis to observe initial steps in protein folding and secondary structure formation. After obtaining his PhD in 2006, he moved to Rockefeller University to pursue postdoctoral research. Working in the laboratory of Tom W. Muir, he developed methods to synthesize chromatin containing defined ubiquitin modifications. In 2012, he was appointed tenure track assistant professor for the Sandoz Foundation Chair at the Institute of Chemical Sciences and Engineering of EPFL. There, he established a program to detect dynamic processes in chromatin regulation, combining chemical biology and biophysics methods. In 2019, he was promoted to Associate Professor at EPFL.

Research 
As a postdoctoral researcher, Beat Fierz contributed to the understanding that chromatin ubiquitylation opens chromatin structure, increasing local chromatin accessibility.

Beat Fierz currently heads the Laboratory of Biophysical Chemistry of Macromolecules (LCBM) at the School of Basic Sciences at EPFL. The LCBM is focused on obtaining a quantitative understanding of chromatin systems from a dynamic perspective. The laboratory develops chemical protein synthesis methods to generate and analyze modified chromatin. Building on chemically defined systems, the LCBM has also developed single-molecule fluorescence methods to reveal chromatin dynamics, in particular structural motions in chromatin fibers, as well as dynamic interactions of chromatin regulatory proteins. Research performed in Beat Fierz's laboratory has also helped elucidating key steps in gene repression via heterochromatin or PRC2. These methodologies can also be applied for the study of DNA sensors such as cGAS, as well as gene regulation via transcription factors.

Recognition 
Beat Fierz was awarded a Consolidator Grant from the European Research Council in 2017, for the project "Chromo-SUMMIT", aiming to decode dynamic chromatin signaling by single-molecule multiplex detection.

He is a member of the Biophysical Society, the Swiss Chemical Society and the Vice-President for the Life Sciences Switzerland (LS2) Section Biophysics.

Key publications

References

External links 
 
 Website of the Laboratory of Biophysical Chemistry of Macromolecules

Living people
University of Basel alumni
Rockefeller University alumni
Academic staff of the École Polytechnique Fédérale de Lausanne
1978 births
21st-century Swiss chemists